National Route 375 is a national highway of Japan connecting Kure, Hiroshima and Ōda, Shimane in Japan, with a total length of 163.4 km (101.53 mi).

References

National highways in Japan
Roads in Hiroshima Prefecture
Roads in Shimane Prefecture